Thomas Jeffery Cole (born April 28, 1949) is the U.S. representative for , serving since 2003. He is a member of the Republican Party and serves as the chairman of the House Rules Committee. During his tenure as the chairman of the National Republican Congressional Committee (NRCC) from 2006 to 2008, he was the fourth-ranking Republican in the House.

A member of the Chickasaw Nation, Cole is one of five Native Americans in the House who are enrolled tribal members. The others are fellow Republicans Markwayne Mullin of Oklahoma (Cherokee) and Josh Brecheen of Oklahoma (Choctaw), and Democrats Sharice Davids of Kansas (HoChunk) and Mary Peltola of Alaska (Yupik). In 2022, Cole became the longest-serving Native American in the history of Congress.

Early life, education, and academic career
Cole was born in Shreveport, Louisiana, the son of John D. Cole and Helen Te Ata (née Gale), who was the first Native American elected to the Oklahoma Senate. They returned to Oklahoma, where family on both sides lived. His ancestors had been in the territory for five generations, and he was raised in Moore, halfway between Oklahoma City and Norman.

Cole graduated from Grinnell College in 1971 with a B.A. in history. His postgraduate degrees include an M.A. from Yale University (1974) and a Ph.D. from the University of Oklahoma (1984), both in British history. Cole's Ph.D. thesis was Life and Labor in the Isle of Dogs: The Origins and Evolution of an East London Working-Class Community, 1800–1980. He did research abroad as a Thomas J. Watson Fellow and was a Fulbright Fellow (1977–78) at the University of London. He served as an assistant professor in history and politics in college before entering politics and winning political office.

Early political career
Following his mother, who served as a state representative and senator, Cole was elected to the Oklahoma Senate in 1988, serving until 1991. He chaired the Oklahoma Republican Party for much of the 1980s. He resigned from the state senate mid-term to accept an appointment as executive director of the National Republican Congressional Committee. From 1995 to 1999, he served as Oklahoma's Secretary of State, appointed by Governor Frank Keating. He assisted with the recovery efforts after the 1995 Oklahoma City bombing.

Building on his involvement in national politics, Cole resigned from Keating's administration when asked to become chief of staff to the Republican National Committee. In 2006 he was elected chair of the RNC.

Cole spent two years working as a paid consultant for the United States Chamber of Commerce, but his primary effort in politics was as a political consultant for candidates. Along with partners Sharon Hargrave Caldwell and Deby Snodgrass, his firm (Cole, Hargrave, Snodgrass and Associates) played a large part in strengthening the Republican Party in Oklahoma. He backed a number of candidates who were elected to office during the Republican Revolution of 1994, when it gained dominance in the state. Among their clients have been Keating, J.C. Watts, Tom Coburn, Frank Lucas, Mary Fallin, Wes Watkins, Steve Largent, Chip Pickering, and Linda Lingle.

U.S. House of Representatives

Elections
During his initial campaign for the House of Representatives in 2002, Cole received the endorsement of Watts, the popular outgoing congressman. This helped him win the general election over Democratic nominee and former Oklahoma State Senator Darryl Roberts, with 53.8% of the vote to Roberts's 46.1%. Cole has won at least 63% of the vote in each of his eight reelection campaigns, and he ran unopposed in 2010.

Tenure
Following the 2006 election cycle, the members of the House Republican Conference elected Cole to the post of NRCC Chairman, placing him in charge of national efforts to assist Republican candidates for Congress.

Cole established a solidly conservative voting record during his nine years in the House. He has consistently voted anti-abortion and for gun rights. He also has pro-business positions, supporting free trade, the military, veterans, and educating other congressmen on American Indian issues. He favors loosening immigration restrictions and imposing stricter limits on campaign funds. In 2012, he sponsored H.R. 5912, which would prohibit public funds from being used for political party conventions. This legislation passed the House in September but awaits action by the Senate. During his tenure, Cole has been a leading voice for strengthening protections for Native American women under the Violence Against Women Act.

In June 2013, after another failure of the United States farm bill in Congress, Cole called the failure inexcusable. His district in Oklahoma includes some of the state's farming communities, and if the Farm Bill passed, it would have saved $40 billion over a ten-year period.

As chair of the House Appropriations Subcommittee on the Legislative Branch, Cole was responsible for introducing the Legislative Branch Appropriations Act, 2015 (H.R. 4487; 113th Congress). The bill would appropriate $3.3 billion to the legislative branch for FY 2015, about the same amount it received in FY 2014. According to Cole, the bill meets its goals "in both an effective and efficient manner, and has done so in a genuinely bipartisan, inclusive and deliberative fashion."

In 2013, Cole introduced the Home School Equity Act for Tax Relief. The bill would allow some homeschool parents to take tax credits for purchasing classroom materials.

Cole expressed his intention in 2018 to push his Tribal Labor Sovereignty Act into the spending bill as an omnibus. The bill would "make clear that the National Labor Relations Board has no jurisdiction over businesses owned and operated by an Indian tribe and located on tribal land."

The Lugar Center ranked Cole the 91st most bipartisan member of the House during the 114th United States Congress.

2016 House Speakership election 
In the contest for House Speaker that followed the resignation of John Boehner Cole supported the claims of Paul Ryan:

"Anyone who attacks Paul Ryan as being insufficiently conservative is either woefully misinformed or maliciously destructive...Paul Ryan has played a major role in advancing the conservative cause and creating the Republican House majority. His critics are not true conservatives. They are radical populists who neither understand nor accept the institutions, procedures and traditions that are the basis of constitutional governance."

Political positions

Cole supported President Donald Trump's 2017 executive order to impose a temporary ban on entry to the U.S. to citizens of seven Muslim-majority countries.

In January 2021, Cole voted against the certification of the Electoral College results in the 2020 presidential election. He subsequently voluntarily gave up an honorary degree from Grinnell College. In May 2021, Cole voted against the creation of a bipartisan commission to investigate the January 6 insurrection.

In 2021, Cole joined a majority of Republican representatives in signing onto an amicus brief to overturn Roe v. Wade. Following the Supreme Court's decision to overrule Roe in June 2022, Cole celebrated the outcome, saying in part "not only is this a monumental win for states’ rights, but also the rights of unborn children."

Iraq
In June 2021, Cole was one of 49 House Republicans to vote to repeal the AUMF against Iraq.

Big Tech
In 2022, Cole was one of 39 Republicans to vote for the Merger Filing Fee Modernization Act of 2022, an antitrust package that would crack down on corporations for anti-competitive behavior.

Committee memberships
 Committee on Appropriations (Vice Ranking Member)
 Subcommittee on Labor, Health and Human Services, Education, and Related Agencies (Ranking Member)
 Subcommittee on Defense
 Subcommittee on Interior, Environment, and Related Agencies
 Committee on the Budget
 Committee on Rules (chair)

Caucus Membership 

 Republican Study Committee

Electoral history

 In 2010, no Democrat or independent candidate filed to run in OK-4. The results printed here are from the Republican primary, where the election was decided.

Personal life
Cole and his wife, Ellen, have one son, Mason. He is a member of the United Methodist Church and lives in Moore.

Cole has said, "I was raised to think of myself as Native American and, most importantly, as Chickasaw." Cole has said that a great-aunt of his was the Native American storyteller Te Ata. Describing his heritage, he said his "mother Helen Cole was...extraordinarily proud of [their] Native American history and was, frankly, the first Native American woman ever elected to state senate in Oklahoma."

Cole sits on the Smithsonian Institution Board of Regents and the National Fulbright Association. Cole is featured in the play Sliver of a Full Moon by Mary Kathryn Nagle for his role in the reauthorization of the Violence Against Women Act in 2013.

See also
 List of Native Americans in the United States Congress
 List of Native American politicians

References

External links

 Congressman Tom Cole official U.S. House website
 Tom Cole for Congress
 
 
 
 Biography and Videos – Chickasaw.TV

|-

|-

|-

|-

|-

1949 births
Living people
20th-century American politicians
21st-century American politicians
20th-century Native American politicians
21st-century Native American politicians
Chickasaw people of Choctaw descent
American United Methodists
American Methodists
Chickasaw Nation state legislators in Oklahoma
Christians from Oklahoma
Grinnell College alumni
Methodists from Oklahoma
Native American Christians
Native American members of the United States Congress
Republican Party Oklahoma state senators
People from Moore, Oklahoma
Politicians from Shreveport, Louisiana
Protestants from Oklahoma
Republican Party members of the United States House of Representatives from Oklahoma
Secretaries of State of Oklahoma
University of Oklahoma alumni
Watson Fellows
Yale University alumni